Kouh-Est is a departments of Logone Oriental Region in Chad. Its chief town is Bodo.

Subdivisions 
The Kouh-Est department is divided into 3 sub-prefectures:

 Bodo
 Bédjo
 Beti

Administration 
Prefect of Kouh-East

 October 9, 2008: Moregan Tarnodji Gosngar 
 2010: Sougour Mahamat Galama

References 

Departments of Chad